Beautiful One is a song written by Tim Hughes. It was released as a single from By the Tree's 2004 album Hold You High. "Beautiful One" was originally sung by Jeremy Camp on his 2004 album Carried Me. That same year By the Tree covered "Beautiful One" on Hold You High.

Charts
Weekly

Decade-end

References

External links
 Beautiful One Jeremy Camp Lyrics
 Beautiful One By the Tree Lyrics

2004 singles
2004 songs
Word Records singles
BEC Recordings